Košarkaški klub Slavonski Brod is a professional basketball club based in Slavonski Brod, Croatia. It competes in the Croatian League. For many years the club was known as Oriolik, Svjetlost Brod, Brod-Svjetlost and KK Đuro Đaković due to sponsorship reasons.

In December 2014, Slavonski Brod withdrew from Croatian League due to financial troubles.

External links
Club info

KK Slavonski Brod
Basketball teams in Croatia
Basketball teams established in 1946
Basketball teams in Yugoslavia